The UNH Wildcat Sports Radio Network is an American radio network that carries New Hampshire Wildcats sports, the athletic division of the University of New Hampshire.

Sports coverage 
Football
Men's and women's Basketball
Men's and women's college Hockey

Stations

Flagship
WGIR 610 AM Manchester
WQSO 96.7 FM Rochester
WPKX 930 AM Rochester

Affiliate stations
WNTK-FM 99.7 FM New London (streaming at (their website)
WCNL AM 1010 New London
WUVR AM 1490 Lebanon
WASR AM 1420 Wolfeboro

Former stations 

WFEA 1370 AM Manchester
WTSN Dover, former flagship.

External links 
UNH Sports website
TV/Radio schedule

University of New Hampshire
Sports radio networks in the United States
College football on the radio
College basketball on the radio in the United States